The Da'am Workers Party is a revolutionary socialist Jewish–Arab political party in Israel, where it is commonly known by the acronym Da'am. It calls for political and social revolution in favor of workers' rights, the nationalization of key industries, Jewish–Arab coexistence, and gender equality.

Name
The name "Da'am" originates from Arabic and is a reverse acronym for the name Organization for Democratic Action (munaẓẓamāt al-ʿamal ad-dīmuqrāṭiyy). The name also means "support" in Arabic.

History
The party was founded in Haifa in 1995 as a result of splitting process in the communist camp of Israel; in 1960 Matzpen was founded by former members of the Israeli Communist Party and in the 1970s former members of Matzpen founded three organisations, one of them was The Workers Alliance-Avangard, then in 1977 former members of Avangard founded Derech HaNitzoz. Former members of Derech HaNitzoz established Da'am in 1995.

In the 1999 elections the party won only 2,151 votes (0.06%), well below the electoral threshold of 1.5%. The 2003 elections saw a fall in support to just 1,925 votes, though its percentage (0.06%) remained roughly the same due to a reduced turnout. Nevertheless, it still did not pass the threshold. In the 2006 elections the party more than doubled its support, winning 3,692 votes (0.11%). However, with the raising of the threshold to 2%, it was even further away from obtaining even a single seat in the Knesset.

In the 2009 elections it again failed to pass the threshold and did not receive any seats. In the 2013 elections it received 3,374 votes (0.09%) and again did not obtain a seat in the Knesset. The party did not contest the 2015 elections. In the 2019 elections the party campaigned with the slogan "Green Economy — One Country", after it decided to support a one-state solution to the Israeli–Palestinian conflict based on post-nationalism instead of a Palestinian state and to emphasize its support for eco-socialism.

Ideology
The party is a joint Arab–Jewish party emphasizing class identity over ethnic or national ones. It is strongly left-wing, supporting workers' rights (particularly those of Israeli Arabs), opposing discrimination, and holding an internationalist worldview. The party had supported the right of the Palestinian people to found an independent state based on the 1967 borders until 2018, after which the party supported a one-state solution based on civic nationalism. The party is against Israeli unilateralism and occupation of the Palestinian territories. It also opposes political Islam.

Members of the party were involved in the establishment of the Workers Advice Center, "an initiative for building an independent labor association". Ma'an offers support to unemployed and unorganised (non-Union) workers.

In the 2015 Israeli legislative election, it was the only political party in Israel headed by an Israeli Arab woman, Asma Agbarieh.

The party produces the monthly English-language magazine Challenge, as well as the Arabic al Sabar and the Hebrew quarterly Etgar.

References

External links
 

1995 establishments in Israel
Arab political parties in Israel
Political parties established in 1995
Communist parties in Israel
Marxist parties in Israel
Political parties in Israel
Secularism in Israel